Sadie Wren Pinksen (born January 11, 2000) is a Canadian curler from Iqaluit, Nunavut. She currently plays third on Team Brigitte MacPhail.

Career
Pinksen skipped Team Nunavut at eight Canadian Junior Curling Championships from 2013 to 2020. Her best finish was a 2–7 record in 2016, 2018 and 2020. She also represented Nunavut at the 2015 Canada Winter Games, finishing in eleventh with a 2–6 record. In 2018, she won a bronze medal at the 2018 Arctic Winter Games.

In both years, the team failed to reach the main draw after losing out in the pre-qualifying tournament. Pinksen was also supposed to be the alternate for the team at the  event but had to pull out due to a scheduling conflict. She lost in the playdowns of the 2019 event skipping her own rink but was asked to be the alternate once again by the Jennifer Blaney rink. Pinksen was listed as the teams alternate at the 2019 Scotties Tournament of Hearts but through lead stones during the round robin, replacing Megan Ingram. They finished with a 1–6 record. The following season, Pinksen, Alison Griffin and Kaitlin McDonald teamed up with Ontario curler Lori Eddy for the 2020 Scotties Tournament of Hearts. Despite Eddy living in Ontario, she was added to the team as the territory's "import player", after being asked by Griffin. The team automatically qualified for the Scotties as no other team in the Territory decided to challenge them. The team finished with a 2–5 record, including a surprise win against Northern Ontario's Krista McCarville. Team Eddy represented Nunavut again the following year at the 2021 Scotties Tournament of Hearts, where they finished with a winless 0–8 record. Brigitte MacPhail joined the team for the 2021–22 season as their out-of-province player, replacing Eddy at the skip position. The team represented Nunavut at the 2022 Scotties Tournament of Hearts, finishing with a winless 0–8 record.

Pinksen has also competed at two Canadian Mixed Curling Championships, finishing winless at both the 2018 and 2019 events.

Personal life
Pinksen attended the University of Ottawa as a Communications and sociology student, and is currently a management and philosophy student at Dalhousie University She started curling when she was seven years old.

Teams

References

External links

2000 births
Living people
Curlers from Nunavut
Canadian women curlers
People from Iqaluit
University of Ottawa alumni
Dalhousie University alumni